Ade Mustikiana Oktafiani (born 3 October 1999) is an Indonesian footballer who plays a defender for Arema and the Indonesia women's national team.

Club career
Mustikiana has played for Asprov Babel in Indonesia.

International career 
Mustikiana represented Indonesia at the 2022 AFC Women's Asian Cup.

International goals

Honours

Club
PS Bangka
 Pertiwi Cup runner-up: 2021–22

References

External links

1999 births
Living people
Sportspeople from the Bangka Belitung Islands
Indonesian women's footballers
Women's association football defenders
Indonesia women's international footballers